In 245 BC, Andragoras, the Seleucid governor (satrap) of Parthia ("roughly western Khurasan") proclaimed independence from the Seleucids, when - following the death of Antiochus II - Ptolemy III seized control of the Seleucid capital at Antioch, and "so left the future of the Seleucid dynasty for a moment in question."

Meanwhile, "a man called Arsaces, of Scythian or Bactrian origin, [was] elected leader of the Parni tribes." Following the secession of Parthia from the Seleucid Empire and the resultant loss of Seleucid military support, Andragoras had difficulty in maintaining his borders, and about 238 BCE—under the command of "Arsaces and his brother Tiridates"—the Parni  invaded Parthia and seized control of Astabene (Astawa), the northern region of that territory, the administrative capital of which was Kabuchan (Kuchan in the vulgate).

A short while later the Parni seized the rest of Parthia from Andragoras, killing him in the process.

See also 
 Parni
 Seleucid–Parthian wars

Notes

Sources
 
 
 
 

238 BC
Wars involving the Parthian Empire
History of Khorasan
3rd century BC